Ahsan Watts (born 1999), known professionally as Ahsan J.A., is a teenage soul and R&B singer from Newark, New Jersey.

Ashan Watts gained initial attention when his cover of Smokey Robinson's "Who's Lovin' You" went viral on YouTube and again after a second video featured a surprise appearance by Stevie Wonder that ended in a duet of "Ribbon in the Sky". Ahsan credits classic soul and R&B artists such as Stevie Wonder, Frankie Lymon, and Michael Jackson for inspiring him to join his grandfather, Bishop L. C. Terry Sr, in his Fellowship of Holiness Church choir in Newark, NJ, at the age of five. His godfather, Don Richardson, who signed a contract with Def Jam Recordings as a child, brought attention to Ahsan's voice.

After his signing with Interscope Records in 2012, Ahsan performed a cover of "Have Yourself A Merry Little Christmas," featuring Lucki Gurlz.
In November 2013, his single "Under" was released. The song gave attention to Ahsan's motivation to avoid succumbing to the ghetto lifestyles of his native Newark.

Among his live appearances are Arthur Ashe Kids' Day and at Stevie Wonder's 17th Annual House Full of Toys Benefit Concert in 2012. He has performed in Newark as guest of Mayor Cory Booker, Newark mayoral candidate, Ras J. Baraka., and Darlene Love at NJPAC. In 2014, Ahsan toured with Ashanti to Jackson Rancheria.

References

External links 

 
 Red Soul Vibrations
 Videostatic

1999 births
Living people
American soul singers
Musicians from Newark, New Jersey
American tenors
21st-century American singers
21st-century American male singers